

1980

See also 
 1980 in Australia
 1980 in Australian television

References

External links 
 Australian film at the Internet Movie Database

1980
Australia
Films